Stenidea proxima is a species of beetle in the family Cerambycidae. It was described by Stephan von Breuning in 1942. It is known from Ethiopia.

References

Endemic fauna of Ethiopia
proxima
Beetles described in 1942